"Can't Trust Thots" is a song by American singer Wash featuring American rapper French Montana. It was released on September 30, 2014, by Aye Girl Group, Interscope Records and Polydor Records. A remix featuring Waka Flocka Flame instead of Montana was released in March 2015.

Release and reception
"Can't Trust Thots" was released by Aye Girl Group, Interscope Records and Polydor Records as a music download on September 30, 2014, Aye Girl and Interscope sent it to US rhythmic contemporary radio on November 18, 2014. In 2015, "Can't Trust Thots" reached number 35 on the US Billboard Rhythmic chart and number 44 on the Hot R&B/Hip-Hop Airplay chart.

References

2014 songs
2014 singles
French Montana songs
Interscope Records singles
Polydor Records singles
Songs written by Kevin "She'kspere" Briggs
Songs written by Kandi Burruss
Songs written by Maejor
Songs written by French Montana
Songs written by Tameka Cottle
Songs written by Chef Tone